{{Infobox college gymnastics team
|name = Nebraska Cornhuskers men's gymnastics
|founded = 
|logo = Nebraska Cornhuskers logo.svg
|logo_size = 125
|university = University of Nebraska–Lincoln
|conference = Big Ten
|athletic_director = Trev Alberts
|division = 
|location = Lincoln, Nebraska
|coach = Chuck Chmelka
|tenure = 12th
|arena = Bob Devaney Sports Center
|nickname = Cornhuskers
|capacity = 7,907
|national_champion = 1979, 1980, 1981, 1982, 1983, 1988, 1990, 1994
|supersix =
|ncaa_regionals =
|ncaa_tourneys =
|conference_champion = Big Eight: 1964, 1976, 1980, 1982, 1983, 1985, 1986, 1988, 1989, 1990, 1992, 1993, 1994

MPSF: 1997, 1999
}}

The Nebraska Cornhuskers men's gymnastics''' team represents the University of Nebraska–Lincoln in the Big Ten Conference.  Since being established in 1939, the program has won eight national championships, finished as the national runner-up seven times, and won forty-two NCAA event titles. Ten Huskers have gone on to represent the United States in the Olympics.

The team has been coached by Chuck Chmelka since 2010.

Coaches

Coaching history

Coaching staff

Individual NCAA Champions

Olympians
Jim Hartung – 1980, 1984†
Phil Cahoy – 1980
Larry Gerard – 1980
Jim Mikus – 1984
Scott Johnson – 1984†, 1988
Wes Suter – 1988
Kevin Davis – 1988
Tom Schlesinger – 1988
Trent Dimas – 1992†
Francis Allen – 1980, 1992 
Mark Williams – 2016 

† Gold Medalist

All-Americans

Season-by-season results

Notes

References